Ernest Aldrich Simpson (6 May 1897 – 30 November 1958) was an American-born British shipbroker, best known as the second husband of Wallis Simpson, later wife of the former King Edward VIII.

Simpson served as an officer in the Coldstream Guards before becoming a shipbroker in the family firm of SSY.

Background

Born in New York City, Simpson was educated at The Hill School before attending Harvard University. Simpson was commissioned in the British Army, serving as a captain in the Coldstream Guards during World War I. His father, Ernest Louis Simpson, a British citizen of Jewish background whose original surname was Solomon, co-founded the global shipbroking firm Simpson, Spence & Young, trading since 1880. His mother, Charlotte Woodward Gaines, was American, daughter of a New York City attorney.

His elder sister and only sibling, Maud Simpson (1879–1962), married, in 1905, Major Peter Kerr-Smiley MP.

Simpson became a British subject during World War I, shortly after graduating from Harvard and renouncing his United States citizenship.

"In his younger years he was described as tall, with blue eyes, blond, curly hair, a neat blond moustache and a fastidious dresser," according to an article in The New York Times.

First marriage
His first wife, whom he married in New York City, on 22 February 1923 and divorced in 1928, was Dorothea Dechert (died 1967), the former wife of James Flanagan Dechert (died 1968), a Princeton University alumnus, whom she married in May 1916 and divorced in April 1920. Born Dorothea Webb Parsons, she was a daughter of Arthur Webb Parsons, a lawyer, and his wife, the former Frances Margaret Graves.

Dorothea and Ernest Simpson had one child, Audrey C. C. Simpson (born 1924), who married firstly on 5 October 1945, American journalist Murray Rossant (died 1988, brother of architect James Rossant) and, secondly on 1 April 1949, New York advertising executive Edmund Hope Driggs III. Audrey Simpson Driggs died at Calgary, Canada on 2 November 2013.

Simpson also had a stepdaughter by this marriage, Cynthia Josephine Dechert (born 1916).

Second marriage

Simpson's second wife was Wallis Warfield Spencer (1896–1986), the Blue Ridge Summit, Pennsylvania-born former wife of Earl Winfield Spencer Jr. and the only child of Teackle Wallis Warfield. They married in London, England, on 21 July 1928, and divorced on 3 May 1937. As his obituary in The New York Times noted, the publicity over his second wife's remarriage to the Duke of Windsor and her subsequent fame thrust him into the role of "the forgotten man". The two remained friends, however, the newspaper noted, with the now Duchess of Windsor sending him flowers when he was in hospital for surgery and Simpson offering advice and clarification when his former wife was working on her memoirs.

Third marriage

His third wife was Mary Raffray (née Mary Huntemuller Kirk, 1896–1941), a daughter of Henry Child Kirk, proprietor of the Kirk Silversmith Co. of Baltimore, Maryland and his wife, the former Edith Huntemuller, who dedicated her book Her Garden Was Her Delight to her memory. Mary Simpson's letters, along with her sister's, are held at Harvard University Archives.

A girlhood friend of Wallis Simpson's, Mary Kirk was a bridesmaid at her first wedding and introduced her to Ernest Simpson in 1925; she also was the "other woman" with whom Simpson took a hotel suite in Bray, Berkshire, in order to give his wife evidence of adultery, so that she could bring divorce proceedings against him. Ernest Simpson and Mary Raffray were married in the Diamond Jubilee ballroom of the Brooklawn Country Club in Fairfield, Connecticut on 19 November 1937, six months after the groom's divorce from Wallis Simpson and three weeks after the bride's divorce from Jacques Raffray, a French aviator (son of French explorer Achille Raffray), whom Mary had married on 29 July 1918.

Mary and Ernest Simpson had one child, Ernest Henry Child Simpson, born in 1939, and christened at the Guards Chapel, Wellington Barracks, London. In June 1940, the Simpsons sent their infant son to the United States to escape the War, in particular the Blitz. However, a month before Mary's death, he returned with her to England. Mary Simpson died of cancer on 2 October 1941, at the couple's home – Stanton House, Stanton Fitzwarren, Wiltshire. Ernest (the son) changed his name to Aharon Solomons in 1958 before being commissioned as an officer in the Israeli Army.

Fourth marriage
Simpson's fourth wife was Avril Leveson-Gower (née Avril Joy Mullens, 1910 – 28 November 1978), the former wife of Brigadier-General Hugh Nugent Leveson-Gower and Prince George Imeretinsky. She was the younger daughter of Sir John Ashley Mullens, of Manor House, Haslemere, Surrey, by his wife, the former Evelyne Maude Adamson. Simpson and Avril Leveson-Gower were married in London on 12 August 1948. By this marriage Simpson had a stepdaughter, Lucinda Gaye Leveson-Gower (born 1935, married Sir Spencer Le Marchant in 1955). Avril Simpson was killed in a car crash in Mexico in 1978.

Death
Simpson died suffering from throat cancer, on 30 November 1958 in London, aged 61.

In popular culture
He was played by Charles Keating in Edward and Mrs Simpson (1978).

He was played by Tom Wilkinson in The Woman He Loved (1988).

He was played by Anthony Smee in Bertie and Elizabeth (2002).

He was played by David Westhead in Wallis & Edward (2005).

He was portrayed by David Harbour in W.E., a 2011 romantic drama film about the Duke and Duchess of Windsor's courtship; the movie was co-written and directed by Madonna.

Notes and references
Notes

References

1890s births
1958 deaths
American emigrants to England
English people of German-Jewish descent
The Hill School alumni
Harvard University alumni
Coldstream Guards officers
British Army personnel of World War I
Naturalised citizens of the United Kingdom
Businesspeople from New York City
Shipbroking companies
Abdication of Edward VIII
Deaths from esophageal cancer
Deaths from cancer in England